Thorndale Farm is a historic farm property at 652 North Buckton Road, in rural Frederick County, Virginia east of Middletown. It was originally part of a much larger land grant made to John Larrock, a militia captain the American Revolutionary War. Part of the farm was involved in the 1864 Battle of Cedar Creek in the American Civil War.

The property was listed on the National Register of Historic Places in 2016.

See also
 National Register of Historic Places listings in Frederick County, Virginia

References

Houses on the National Register of Historic Places in Virginia
Houses completed in 1790
Houses in Frederick County, Virginia
National Register of Historic Places in Frederick County, Virginia
Historic districts in Virginia